As the coalition of Bay Areas counties predicted when it lobbied for the creation of Moffett Federal Airfield in the late 1920s, the base's research program and facilities catalyzed the development of numerous private technology and aerospace corporations, among them Lockheed Martin and the Hiller Aircraft Corporation.

Over the years, the NASA Ames Research Center used its laboratories and wind tunnels to test dozens of propulsion systems and airplane designs.

1930s
The beginning of a West Coast National Advisory Committee for Aeronautics (NACA) Aeronautical Laboratory

1936

Recommending Moffett Federal Airfield
The NACA puts together a special committee on the relationship of NACA to National Defense in time of war, chaired by the Chief of the Army Air Corps, Major General Oscar Westover. Its report, released two years later, called for expanded facilities in the form of a new laboratory—an action underscored by Charles Lindbergh, who had just returned from a European tour warning that Germany clearly surpassed America in military aviation.

The Moffett Federal Airfield area is selected over dozens of competing sites by a federal committee headed by aviator Charles Lindbergh. Centrally located on the West Coast, protected by coastal mountains, next to a large body of water to transport heavy equipment, and with its mammoth, unmistakable Hangar One (Moffett Field, California) visible from the air, Naval Air Station Moffett Federal Airfield already had aircraft runways, good access to electricity and West Coast industrial centers. Stanford University, which had ongoing wind tunnel research with the Navy had a well-regarded aeronautics program, also creating a draw.

A follow-up committee, chaired by Rear Admiral Arthur Cook, chief of the Navy's Bureau of Aeronautics, recommended that the new facility should be located on the West Coast, where it could work closely with the growing aircraft industry in California and Washington.

Following Congressional debate, the NACA received money for expanded facilities at Langley (pacifying the Virginia Congressman who ran the House Appropriations Committee) along with a new laboratory at Moffett Federal Airfield.

1939

August,  
NACA Charles Lindbergh Committee Established by Congress to evaluate the sites to build the west's NACA Aeronautical Laboratory

September 1, 
German planes, tanks, and troops invade Poland. and World War II begins.

October,  
62 Acres adjacent to NAS Moffett Field are selected for an Aeronautical Laboratory

December 20, 
Ground is broken for the new aeronautical center

Under the leadership of director Smith De France, researchers came to this NACA Laboratory for more freedom to pursue new ideas. The resulting facility has been on the cutting edge of aeronautics research ever since.

1940s
 De-icing
 Conical Chamber
 Wind Tunnels
 Flight Research
 Swept wing
 Transonic Theory

1940

The NACA site at Moffett Federal Airfield becomes the Ames Aeronautical Laboratory, in honor of Dr. Joseph Ames, charter member of the NACA and its longtime chairman.

Key personnel for the new laboratory came from Langley, and the junior lab tended to defer to Langley for some time.

1941

7 December,  
The Japanese Attack Pearl Harbor Attack

1945

14 & 15 August
End of World War II in Asia occurs, when armed forces of Japan surrendered to the forces of the Allied Powers

After World War II
After several years of managing their own wartime projects, the Ames laboratory felt less like an adolescent and more like a peer of Langley. The NACA, like NASA after it, became a family of labs, but with strong individual rivalries.

The Ames Aeronautical Laboratory at end of the war has 11 Navy aircraft, including the Ryan FR-1 Fireball, were assigned to the facility.

1950s
 Flight simulators
 Arc Jets
 Blunt Body ReEntry Vehicle Concept
 Hyper-velocity Free Flight

1950

Building the Unitary Plan Wind Tunnel Complex
At a cost of $32 million, construction of the Unitary Plan Wind Tunnel at Ames began in 1950-1951 and continued until 1955.

Because no one wind tunnel could meet all the demands for additional research facilities simulating the entire range of aircraft and missile flight, NACA chose to build the Ames tunnel with three separate test sections drawing power from a common centralized power plant.

The Transonic test section spanned 11 by 11 feet, while the two Subsonic sections were smaller: nine by seven feet and eight by seven feet. Giant valves 20 feet in diameter supplied air from one supersonic leg to another.

1955

The Unitary Plan Wind Tunnel Complex opens.  The American West Coast aircraft industry quickly capitalizes on the new research facility.

Famed Boeing fleet of commercial transports and the Douglas DC-8, DC-9, and DC-10 were all tested here; as well as military aircraft such as the F-111 fighter, the C-5A transport and the B-1 bomber.

Unitary Plan Wind Tunnel Complex facts:
The site Covers 11 Acres, the basic design integrates and embodies three test sections for different speeds so that a single model can be tested over the entire speed range from Mach 0.40 to Mach 3.45

1958

Congress creates NASA with the National Aeronautics and Space Act
The NACA Ames Aeronautical Laboratory was renamed NASA Ames Research Center and became a NASA field center.

1960s
 Lifting Body
 Project Mercury, Project Gemini, & Apollo Program Heat shield Tests
 Apollo Program Guidance system
 Apollo Program Re-Entry Shape
 Tektites
 Space Life Science

1961

May 25, 
John F. Kennedy's Speech 
The Decision to Go to the Moon: speech before a Joint Session of Congress

Unitary Plan Wind Tunnel Complex
1960s and 1970s almost all NASA manned space vehicles including the Space Shuttle are tested in the Ames Unitary Plan Wind Tunnel complex.

1970s
 Pioneer program to Venus John D. Mihalov
 Pioneer programs 10 & 11 John D. Mihalov
 Computational Fluid Dynamics
 Kuiper Airborne Observatory
 Viking program Biological Lab
 Tilt-rotor

1980s
 Galileo Probe John D. Mihalov
 Supercomputers
 Air Transportation Systems
 80x120 Foot Wind Tunnel
 ER-2

1985

The Unitary Plan Wind Tunnel complex was nominated and accepted by the Department of Interior as a National Historic Landmark

The wind tunnel complex assets are divided as follows:
 Wind Tunnels (4)
 Engine Development (3)
 Rocket Engine Test Stands (3)
 Rocket Test Facility (1)
 Rocket (1)
 Launch Pads (1)
 Apollo Training Facilities (4)
 Apollo Hardware Test Facility (1)
 Unmanned Spacecraft Test Facilities (3)
 Tracking Station (1)
 Mission Control Centers (2)
 Other Support Facility (1)

1987

The Transonic Wind Tunnel Complex expands  to 80 by 120 feet and the power of its huge fans was nearly quadrupled.

1990s
 X-36
 Human-centered computing
 Education
 Lunar Prospector
 NASA Research Park
 Astrobiology

1991

Post-Cold War defense cutbacks and related Base Realignment and Closure (BRAC) actions in the 1990s identified NAS Moffett Field for closure.

1994

July 1 
NASA Ames Research Center (ARC), assumed control of the NAS Moffett Field facility. The NAS Moffett Federal Airfield name was changed to NASA Research Park (NRP), and the Moffett Federal Airfield (MFA).

Supervision of Moffett Federal Airfield's two runways, three aircraft hangars, and 3.5 million square feet of facilities was turned over to the NASA Ames Research Center.

As the new federal custodian, NASA Ames operates the shared facility in the heart of "Silicon Valley" at the southern end of San Francisco Bay and serves as host to a number of other federal, civilian, and military resident agencies.

1996

May
The American Society of Mechanical Engineers dedicated the Unitary Plan Wind Tunnel complex as an International Historic Mechanical Engineering Landmark.

1997
April 30, 
The Universities Space Research Association (USRA) purchases the aircraft for use as the Sofia Airborne Observatory

October 27, 
NASA purchased the aircraft from the USRA

1998

Moffett Federal Airfield - Naval Base Realignment and Closure (BRAC) Toxic Remediation started.

2000s
 Planetary Science
 Kepler program
 
 Nanotechnology
 LCross
 NASA Lunar Science Institute
 Pleiades supercomputer

2004
November, 
Columbia supercomputer debuted as the second most powerful supercomputer on the TOP500 list.

2007
April 26, 
Sofia Airborne Observatory Maiden flight

2009
December 18, 
Sofia Airborne Observatory performs the first test flight in which the telescope door was fully opened. This phase lasted for two minutes of the 79-minute flight.

2008

The NASA Ames Research Center leases 42 acres between the research center and San Francisco Bay to Google, Inc.

2010s

2010
May 26, 
Sofia Airborne Observatory's telescope saw first light, returning images showing M82's core and heat from Jupiter's formation escaping through its cloud cover.
December, 
Initial "routine" Sofia Airborne Observatory science flights begin.

2013

Google begins building a 1.1 million square foot office complex consisting of nine buildings overlooking San Francisco Bay dubbed "Bay View."  The buildings are to be the new headquarters for Google and will be part of the nearby Googleplex.

References
Citations

Bibliography
 NASA.gov
 NASA.gov

Ames Research Center
Mountain View, California
Ames Research Center